Live in Paris EP (also known as the Deezer EP) is a live EP by American rock band Red Hot Chili Peppers, released on July 1, 2016 exclusively through the web-based music streaming service Deezer. The songs were recorded on June 14, 2016 at Canal+ studios in Paris during The Getaway World Tour.

Track listing

Personnel
Red Hot Chili Peppers
 Anthony Kiedis – lead vocals
 Josh Klinghoffer – guitar, backing vocals
 Flea – bass
 Chad Smith – drums

Additional musicians
 Chris Warren – keyboards, electronic percussion pad
Nate Walcott - piano, keyboards

References

External links
Red Hot Chili Peppers website
Live In Paris EP

Red Hot Chili Peppers live albums
2016 EPs
2016 live albums
Live EPs
Red Hot Chili Peppers EPs